Ionuț Daniel Șerban (born 7 August 1995) is a Romanian professional footballer who plays as a defensive midfielder for Cetatea Turnu Măgurele. His first ever goal in Liga I was scored on 20 April 2014, for Dinamo București, in a match against Astra Giurgiu.

References

External links

1995 births
Living people
Sportspeople from Ploiești
Romanian footballers
Association football midfielders
FC Sportul Studențesc București players
FC Dinamo București players
Liga I players
Liga III players
Association football defenders